The Polybius square, also known as the Polybius checkerboard, is a device invented by the ancient Greeks Cleoxenus and Democleitus, and made famous by the historian and scholar Polybius. The device is used for fractionating plaintext characters so that they can be represented by a smaller set of symbols, which is useful for telegraphy, steganography, and cryptography. The device was originally used for fire signalling, allowing for the coded transmission of any message, not just a finite amount of predetermined options as was the convention before.

Basic form
According to Polybius' Histories, the device was invented by Cleoxenus and Democleitus, and further developed by Polybius himself. The device partitioned the alphabet into five tablets with five letters each (except for the last one with only four). There are no surviving tablets from antiquity. Letters are represented by two numbers from one to five, allowing the representation of 25 characters using only 5 numeric symbols.

The original square used the Greek alphabet laid out as follows:

With the modern Latin alphabet, this is the typical form:

Each letter is then represented by its coordinates in the grid. For example, "BAT" becomes "12 11 44". The 26 letters of the Latin/English alphabet do not fit in a 5 × 5 square, two letters must be combined (usually I and J as above, though C and K is an alternative). Alternatively, a 6 × 6 grid may be used to allow numerals or special characters to be included as well as letters.

A 6 × 6 grid is also usually used for the Cyrillic alphabet (the most common variant has 33 letters, but some have up to 37)  or Japanese hiragana (see cryptography in Japan).

A key could be used to reorder the alphabet in the square, with the letters (without duplicates) of the key being placed at the beginning and the remaining letters following it in alphabetical order. For example, the key phrase "polybius cipher" would lead to the reordered square below.

Applications

Telegraphy 

In his Histories, Polybius outlines the need for effective signalling in warfare, leading to the development of the square. Previously, fire-signalling was useful only for expected, predetermined messages, with no way to convey novel messages about unexpected events. According to Polybius, in the 4th century BCE, Aeneas Tacticus devised a hydraulic semaphore system consisting of matching vessels with sectioned rods labelled with different messages such as "Heavy Infantry", "Ships", and "Corn". This system was slightly better than the basic fire-signalling, but still lacked the ability to convey any needed message. The Polybius square was used to aid in telegraphy, specifically fire-signalling. To send a message, the sender would initially hold up two torches and wait for the recipient to do the same to signal that they were ready to receive the message. The sender would then hold up the first set of torches on his left side to indicate to the recipient which tablet (or row of the square) was to be consulted. The sender would then raise a set of torches on his right side to indicate which letter on the tablet was intended for the message. Both parties would need the same tablets, a telescope (a tube to narrow view, no real magnification), and torches.

The Polybius square has also been used in the form of the "knock code" to signal messages between cells in prisons by tapping the numbers on pipes or walls.  It is said to have been used by nihilist prisoners of the Russian Czars and also by US prisoners of war during the Vietnam War.

Arthur Koestler describes the code being used by political prisoners of Stalin in the 1930s in his anti-totalitarian novel Darkness at Noon. (Koestler had been a prisoner-of-war during the Spanish Civil War.) 
Indeed, it can be signalled in many simple ways (flashing lamps, blasts of sound, drums, smoke signals) and is much easier to learn than more sophisticated codes like the Morse code. However, it is also somewhat less efficient than more complex codes.

Steganography 
The simple representation also lends itself to steganography. The figures from one to five can be indicated by knots in a string, stitches on a quilt, contiguous letters before a wider space or many other ways.

Cryptography 
The Polybius square is also used as a basic cipher called the Polybius cipher. This cipher is quite insecure by modern standards, as it is a substitution cipher with characters being substituted for pairs of digits, which is easily broken through frequency analysis.

Adaptations 
The Polybius square and the Polybius cipher can be combined with other cryptographic methods such as the ADFGVX cipher, Homophonic cipher  and more.

Hybrid Polybius Playfair cipher 
The Playfair cipher is a polyalphabetic substitution cipher invented by Charles Wheatstone and promoted by Lyon Playfair based on a 5 x 5 square which accommodates the alphabet in a manner similar to the Polybius square. The letters in the square are arranged by first inserting the letters of a key (without repetition), before the remaining letters (which appear subsequently in normal alphabetical order). A message is divided into pairs of letters, with a filler letter "x" inserted at the end if the message was of odd length. If both letters of a pair are the same, a filler "x" is inserted between them with an extra "x" inserted at the end of the message to compensate for this. Each pair of letters are then encrypted using the Playfair key table through "mapping rules".

The mapping rules are:

1. If the letters of the pair appear in the same row of the table, replace them with the letters to their immediate right respectively (if a letter of the plaintext pair is the rightmost letter in the row, wrap around to the left side of the row).

2. If the letters of the pair appear in the same column of the table, replace them with the letters immediately below respectively (if a letter in the plaintext pair is on the bottom of the column, wrap around to the top of the column).

3. If the letters of the pair are not on the same row or column, replace them with the letters in the same row of the letter and on the column of the other letter of the pair. The order here is important: the first letter of the encrypted pair is the one that sits in the same row as the first letter and on the column of the second letter of the plaintext pair.

Plaintext message:  HELLO WORLD

Playfair message:  HE  LX  LO  WO  RL  DX

Playfair cipher:  KG  YV  RV  VQ  GR  CZ

The decryption rules are the same as the encryption. The cipher message is mapped with the same Playfair matrix for decryption, and gives the plaintext message back.

For a hybrid Polybius-Playfair cipher, a new and bigger table is used, with messages being encrypted and decrypted twice. The plaintext is encrypted using the Playfair cipher first, and then using the Polybius cipher.

Plaintext message:  HELLO WORLD

Playfair message:  HE  LX  LO  WO  RL  DX

Playfair cipher:  KG  YV  RV  VQ  GR  CZ

Polybius cipher:  3432  1452  2252  5243  3222  2455

See also 
 Phryctoria
 Straddling checkerboard
 Tap code
 Topics in cryptography

References

Classical ciphers
History of telecommunications
Steganography
Ancient Arcadia